Suzanne Lee (born 1970) is a Brooklyn, New York based fashion designer working on fashion and future technologies.

She is a Senior Research Fellow at Central Saint Martins College of Art and Design, the Director of The BioCouture Research Project, and Chief Creative Officer at Modern Meadow.

Her recent Arts and Humanities Research Council (AHRC) funded project BioCouture looks at ecological and sustainability issues surrounding fashion.
She is working with scientists to engineer optimized organisms for growing future consumer products.

In 2007 she published Fashioning the Future: Tomorrow's Wardrobe. The book examines the work of the scientific researchers and fashion designers, such as Issey Miyake, Hussein Chalayan, and Walter Van Beirendonck, who are transforming today's science fiction into tomorrow's reality.

BioCouture

BioCouture is a research project using nature to suggest an innovative future fashion vision. Suzanne Lee uses microbial cellulose (composed of millions of tiny bacteria grown in bathtubs of sweet green tea) to produce clothing. The idea is to grow a dress in a vat of liquid.

BioCouture has been included in Time Magazine's annual roundup of The Top 50 Best Inventions of 2010.

BioFabricate
Lee founded BioFabricate in 2014 to work at the intersection of design, biology and sustainability. They host an annual conference where businesses that biotechnology to develop material, fashion and clothing present work.

References

Further reading
 Suzanne Lee, "Fashioning the Future: Tomorrow's Wardrobe", Thames & Hudson, 2005
 Nicholas Jordan, "From teabags to T-shirts", The Australian, 30 May 2011
 Stefania Vourazeri, "V.O.W N°8 // BioCouture by Suzanne Lee", Yatzer, 25 February 2011

External links
 Official website of BioCouture
 
 Bio-Couture on Exposureroom, Video for the new Trash Fashion exhibition at the Science Museum (archived in 2011)

1970 births
Living people
American fashion designers
American women fashion designers
BioArt
21st-century American women